Jean Royer (26 June 1938 – 4 July 2019) was a French Canadian writer and poet.

Biography
Royer was a literary critic for the daily newspaper Le Devoir from 1971 to 1982. He was President of Académie des lettres du Québec from 1998 to 2004.

Royer's writings are kept in the archives of The National Library and Archives of Quebec.

In 1989, he was awarded Prix Alain-Grandbois, and in 2014, he received the Prix Athanase-David.

References

1938 births
2019 deaths
20th-century Canadian poets
20th-century Canadian male writers
21st-century Canadian poets
21st-century Canadian male writers
Canadian male poets
Canadian literary critics
Canadian poets in French
French Quebecers
Writers from Quebec
Prix Alain-Grandbois
People from Chaudière-Appalaches
Université Laval alumni